Rick LeGuerrier is a Canadian journalist, director and independent film producer.
He is one of two founders of Dream Street Pictures, created in 2004 with Timothy M. Hogan.

Career

Rick LeGuerrier was first a journalist reporting from Canada, the US and Europe, then as a broadcast executive, and, for the last decade, as an independent producer and partner in Dream Street.

Producing

LeGuerrier's works include documentary "The Zoo Revolution", which is now in production for CBC Television’s Doc Zone, and the television movie, The Phantoms, which was shown on the CBC. He produced Wild and Dangerous: The World of Exotic Pets for the CBC in 2015.

Awards and nominations
LeGuerrier and projects he produced have been nominated for or received various awards including:
 2014 International Kids Emmy
 WGC Screenwriting Awards 
 Canadian Screen Awards
 4 Gemini Nominations 
 Won 2013 Shaw Rocket Prize (Youth/Family)
 Won Atlantic Journalism Awards: 1991 Citation of Merit Enterprise Reporting Radio, 1993 Gold Spot News Radio

References

External links 
Rick LeGuerrier at the Internet Movie Database
The Phantoms at the Internet Movie Database

Canadian television journalists
Canadian documentary film producers
Canadian documentary film directors
Living people
Year of birth missing (living people)